Also known as Mu. Va. and Varatharasanar, was a Tamil scholar, author and academic from Tamil Nadu, India.
He was born in an aristocratic Tuluva Vellala family near Vellore. He was a prolific writer whose published works include 13 novels, 6 plays, 2 short story collections, 11 essay anthologies, a book on the history of Tamil literature, books on Tamil linguistics and children's books. During 1961–71, he was the head of the Tamil department at the University of Madras. In 1961, he was awarded the Sahitya Akademi Award for Tamil for his novel Agal Vilakku. During 1971–74, he was the vice-chancellor of the University of Madurai.

Bibliography

Fiction

Novels
 Kallo Kaviyamo
 Nenjil oru Mul
 Agal vilakku
 Karithundu
 Pertra manam
 Senthamarai
 Paavai
 Andha Naal
 Malar Vizhi
 Alli
 Kayamai
 Mann kudisai
 Vada malar

Short stories
 Ki. pi. 2000
 Pazhiyum Pavamum
 Viduthala

 Kurattai oli

Plays
 Pachayappar
 Manachandru
 Ilango
 Doctor ali
 Moondru nadagangal
 Kadhal enge?

Non-fiction

Essays
 Aramum Arasiyalum
 Arasiyal alaigal
 Kuruvi por
 Penmai Vazhga
 Kuzhandhai
 Kalvi
 Mozhi parru
 Nattu Patru
 Ulaga peredu
 Mannin madhippu
 Nalvazhvu

Literary history
 History of Tamil literature
 Tamil nenjam
 Manal veedu
 Thiruvalluval or Vazhkai vilakkam
 Thirukkural Thelivurai
 Ovacheydhi
 Kannagi
 Madhavi
 Mullai thinai
 Nedunthogai virundhu
 Kurunthogai virundhu
 Narrinai virundhu
 Ilakkiya araychi
 Narrinai selvam
 Kurunthogai selvam
 Nadaivandi
 Konguther vazhkai
 Pulavar kanneer
 Ilakkiya thiran
 Ilakkiya Marabu
Ilango adigal
 Ilakkiya Katchikal
 Kural kattum kadhalar
 Sanga ilakkiyathil iyarkai

Children's literature
 Kuzhandhai pattukal
 Ilaingarkku erra iniya pattugal
 Padiyathar padum paadu
 Kannudaya vazhvu

Letter anthologies
 Annaikku
 Thambikku
 Thangaikku
 Nanbarukku

Travelogues
 yan kanda ilankai

Linguistics
 Mozhi nool
 Mozhiyin kathai
 Ezhuthin kathai
 Sollin kathai
 Mozhi varalaaru
Mozhi iyar katturaigal

Biography
 Aringar Bernard Shaw
 Gandhi annal
 Kavingar Tagore
 Thiru. Vi. Ka.

English books

 The Treatment of Nature in Sangam

 Ilango Adigal

References

1912 births
1974 deaths
Indian Tamil people
Tamil writers
Writers from Tamil Nadu
Children's writers in Tamil
Recipients of the Sahitya Akademi Award in Tamil
Indian Tamil academics
Tirukkural commentators
20th-century Indian novelists
20th-century Indian short story writers
20th-century Indian essayists
20th-century Indian dramatists and playwrights
Academic staff of the University of Madras
Heads of universities and colleges in India